San Felipe, also known as San Felipe de Austin, is a town in Austin County, Texas, United States. The town was the social, economic, and political center of the early Stephen F. Austin colony. The population was 747 at the 2010 census.

History
In 1823, John McFarland operated a ferry on the Brazos River near this location. In the fall of the same year, the site was chosen by Stephen F. Austin, with the help of Felipe Enrique Neri, Baron de Bastrop, to be the main site in Texas for American colonization. Founded in 1824 as San Felipe de Austin, the town served as the capital of Stephen F. Austin's first colony and the founding site of the Texas Rangers. James (Jack) Cummins was appointed as the first alcalde or mayor.

By 1828, San Felipe had been surveyed, with Calle Commercio laid out as the main commercial street. Austin and his secretary, Samuel May Williams, both resided in log cabins on the square. There were about 30 buildings, and at least one of these was a wood-framed structure. Also on the square was the tavern of Jonathan Peyton. By 1835, the town's population had increased to around 600. It was home to the first post office and one of the earliest newspapers a land offices in Texas. San Felipe was second only to San Antonio as a commercial center of Texas.

The Texas conventions of 1832 and 1833 and the Consultation of November 3, 1835, were held here. San Felipe acted as the capital for the provisional government of Texas until the Convention of 1836. The town was burned in 1836 to prevent the Mexican army from capturing it, and rebuilt a few years later, but never regained its popularity. The oldest post office in Texas is located here (ZIP code 77473).

Local residents dedicated the original townsite as a commemorative site in 1928. In 1940, the town of San Felipe donated most of the original townsite property to the state, which is now the San Felipe de Austin State Historic Site.

Geography
The town limits extend south below Interstate 10, with access at Exit 723. Stephen F. Austin State Park is located in the northern part of the town.

Climate
The climate in this area is characterized by hot, humid summers and generally mild to cool winters.  According to the Köppen climate classification system, San Felipe has a humid subtropical climate, Cfa on climate maps.

Demographics

The population was 747 at the 2010 census.

As of the census of 2000, 868 people, 312 households, and 234 families resided in the town. The population density was 103.7 people per square mile (40.0/km2). The 347 housing units averaged 41.5/sq mi (16.0/km2). The racial makeup of the town was 60.83% White, 34.56% African American, 0.35% Native American, 3.00% from other races, and 1.27% from two or more races. Hispanics or Latinos of any race were 9.45% of the population.

Of the 312 households, 29.8% had children under the age of 18 living with them, 57.7% were married couples living together, 13.5% had a female householder with no husband present, and 24.7% were not families. About 23.1% of all households were made up of individuals, and 8.3% had someone living alone who was 65 years of age or older. The average household size was 2.78 and the average family size was 3.26.

In the town, the population was distributed as 27.8% under the age of 18, 8.1% from 18 to 24, 22.9% from 25 to 44, 27.0% from 45 to 64, and 14.3% who were 65 years of age or older. The median age was 39 years. For every 100 females, there were 102.3 males. For every 100 females age 18 and over, there were 92.3 males.

The median income for a household in the town was $38,203, and for a family was $43,558. Males had a median income of $31,667 versus $22,500 for females. The per capita income for the town was $17,169. About 9.1% of families and 9.1% of the population were below the poverty line, including 3.1% of those under age 18 and 16.0% of those age 65 or over.

Education
San Felipe is served by the Sealy Independent School District.

Notable people

 Stephen F. Austin, founder of the Austin Colony and "Father of Texas"
 Angelina Eberly, gained fame in the "Archives War," fought to keep the capital (then Austin) from being moved
 Cedric Watson, Zydeco fiddle player

References

External links

Town of San Felipe official website
San Felipe de Austin State Historic Site
Stephen F. Austin State Park
Colonial Capital of Texas

Towns in Austin County, Texas
Towns in Texas
Texas Revolution
Republic of Texas
Texas Ranger Division
Populated places established in 1823
1823 establishments in Texas
Capitals of former nations